Cloudy with a Chance of Meatballs is a video game tie-in based on the film of the same name which is also based upon the 1978 children's book of the same name. The game allows the player to control Flint Lockwood, the film's hero as he must save his town and the world from the rain of food, fighting highly mutated food enemies and using his gadgets to help him on the way.

Gameplay
While controlling Flint through Swallow Falls (Chewandswallow) you must use six different gadgets to help him proceed through levels.  The game has five acts.  In the first act each level only allows Flint to use one gadget.  Act two allows Flint to switch between two, and act three and up allows Flint to use three in a level.  In each level there are 30 Hydronic Foodpods.  These have to be disposed of using certain gadgets.

Characters
Flint Lockwood --- The playable character and hero of the game, growing up misunderstood by his father because of inventing interests.
Sam Sparks --- A weather intern from New York City on who Flint has a crush on. She needs your help in the forest, the Jell-O mold, the Swallow Falls dam and the food covered town.
Tim Lockwood --- Flint's father who owns the bait and tackle shop.
Earl Devereaux --- The police officer of Swallow Falls.
Cal Devereaux --- Earl's son.
Baby Brent McHale --- The celebrity mascot of Baby Brent's Sardines.
Mayor Shelbourne --- The Mayor of Swallow Falls.
Steve the Monkey --- Flint's best (and only) friend that can speak through a thought translator. He is the second players' character for Co-Op gameplay.

Cast
Eric Artell as Flint Lockwood
Anndi McAfee as Sam Sparks
Fred Tatasciore as Tim Lockwood
Khary Payton as Earl Devereaux
Phil LaMarr as Cal Devereaux
Josh Keaton as Baby Brent
James M. Connor as The Mayor
Georgina Cordova as Steve the Monkey

Reception

The game was met with average to very mixed reception.  GameRankings and Metacritic gave it a score of 69.75% and 68 out of 100 for the Wii version; 66.14% and 66 out of 100 for the PlayStation 3 version; 64.18% and 62 out of 100 for the Xbox 360 version; 60% and 60 out of 100 for the PSP version; 53% and 62 out of 100 for the PC version; and 50% and 50 out of 100 for the DS version.

References

External links
Official UK site
 
 

2009 video games
Nintendo DS games
Platform games
PlayStation 3 games
PlayStation Portable games
Video games based on films
Video games based on adaptations
Video games developed in China
Video games scored by James Hannigan
Video games with stereoscopic 3D graphics
Wii games
Cloudy with a Chance of Meatballs (franchise)
Windows games
Xbox 360 games
3D platform games
Multiplayer and single-player video games
Video games about food and drink
Video games set on fictional islands
Sony Pictures video games
Ubisoft games